Muntilan is a district (kecamatan) in the Magelang Regency, Central Java.  Muntilan is about 15 km south of Magelang, 10 km from Mungkid, 25 km north of Yogyakarta, and 90 km from the main town of Semarang located on the northern coast of Java. The town of Muntilan is on the old railway route between Kebon Polo station in Magelang and the main Tugu station in Yogyakarta. Tourists on their way to the well-known Buddhist temple Borobudur usually pass through Muntilan.  

Muntilan township is one of the main market centers on the western slopes of Mount Merapi, a major volcano in central Java within the administrative ambit of the regional government in Magelang.  The locality is densely populated: in 2020, there was a population of 79,944 people living in an area of 28.61 km2, indicating a population density of 2,794 per km2.

History
The adjacent countryside has many villages with pesantren and strong allegiances to more stricter forms of Islam. In contrast, villages closer to the Kraton palaces of Surakarta and Yogyakarta tend to more influenced by  syncretic views of Javanese beliefs. 

Jesuits have long had a presence in the town, having a school, seminary, and a necropolis containing the remains of many of their earlier members. Frans van Lith, a Jesuit priest from The Netherlands, arrived in Muntilan in 1897 and played an important role in promoting Catholicism in the area.  Indonesia's first Catholic cardinal, Justinus Darmojuwono, is buried in Kerkhoof Muntilan, a cemetery for prominent Catholics in the town.

During the Second World War, Muntilan was the site of a Japanese prisoner of war camp which contained many Dutch families.

Current
The streetscape of Muntilan along Jl Pemuda (Pemuda street) provides one of the more classic street views in Central Java.  The line of shop-fronts, and the enclave of Chinese-based businesses in the central area, provide clues as to the nature of commercial development in the town over the last century.

The area is at ever-present risk of needing to respond to natural disasters caused by eruptions of Mt Merapi.  In 1994, for example, a pyroclastic flow from Mt Merapi killed over 20 people in the Muntilan area.

Notes

External links

Magelang Regency
Districts of Central Java